The Pakistan Oilfields Limited is a Pakistani oil and gas exploration company which is a subsidiary of UK-domiciled Attock Oil Company. It is based in Rawalpindi, Punjab Province, Pakistan. 

In 1978, Pakistan Oilfields took over the exploration and production business of Attock Oil Company. Since then, Pakistan Oilfields has been investing independently. Pakistan Oilfields is a leading oil and gas exploration and production company listed on Pakistan Stock Exchange.

History
Pakistan Oilflelds Limited was incorporated on 25 November 1950. In 1978, the POL was horizontically integration and took over the exploration and production business of Attock Oil Company. Since then, POL has been investing independently and in joint venture with various exploration and production companies for the search of oil and gas in the country. In addition to exploration and production of oil and gas, POL also manufactures Liquefied petroleum gas (LPG), Solvent Oil and Sulphur. POL markets LPG under its own brand named POLGAS as well as through its subsidiary CAPGAS (Private) Limited. POL also operates a network of pipelines for transportation of its own as well as other companies' crude oil to Attock Refinery Limited. In 2005, the Company acquired a 25% share in National Refinery Limited, which is the only refining complex in the country producing fuel products as well as lube base oils.

See also

 Attock Group of Companies

References

External links
Company Information of Pakistan Oilfields Limited
 Pakistan Oilfields Limited

Oil and gas companies of Pakistan
Natural gas pipelines in Pakistan
Pakistani subsidiaries of foreign companies
Companies listed on the Pakistan Stock Exchange
Pakistan–Soviet Union relations
Non-renewable resource companies established in 1950
Companies based in Rawalpindi
Energy companies established in 1950
Formerly government-owned companies of Pakistan
Pakistani companies established in 1950